Larysa Moskalenko  is a former sailor, who competed for the Soviet Union and Unified Team. She won a bronze medal in the 470 class at the 1988 Summer Olympics with Iryna Chunykhovska.

She moved to Italy in 1993 and ran a luxury boat rental business. In 2013, she was arrested after she had been hired to provide speedboats to an operation that kidnapped children involved in custody battles. She stated in a pre-trial hearing, "I thought it was all legal, in fact I thought it was a humanitarian action."

References

1963 births
Living people
Soviet female sailors (sport)
Ukrainian female sailors (sport)
Olympic sailors of the Soviet Union
Olympic sailors of the Unified Team
Sailors at the 1988 Summer Olympics – 470
Sailors at the 1992 Summer Olympics – 470
Olympic bronze medalists for the Soviet Union
Olympic medalists in sailing
Medalists at the 1988 Summer Olympics